D.Kay aka David Kulenkampff (born 1979, Vienna, Austria) is a drum and bass producer.

In 2001 D.Kay came together with Rawfull to form Ill.Skillz, having met him while promoting club nights in Vienna. Tracks from D.Kay were released on Soul:R, Bingo, Hospital and Renegade Hardware, and he has worked with Kasra, Marcus Intalex and Black Sun Empire. In 2003 the track "Barcelona" (D.Kay & Epsilon featuring Stamina MC) reached #14 in the UK Singles Chart.

Kulenkampff is a grandchild of the entertainer, Hans-Joachim Kulenkampff.

Discography

Charting singles

References

External links

Interviews
June 2003 interview with D.Kay at Drum & Bass Arena
September 2003 interview with D.Kay at DNB Forum
February 2006 interview with D.Kay at Play.fm
D.Kay: der Soulshaker Interview by Resident  magazine (Germany, 2007)

1979 births
Austrian male musicians
Drum and bass musicians
Living people
Remixers